Claudia Chan Shaw is an Australian-born fashion designer and television presenter of Chinese ancestry.

She was born in Annandale in the inner western suburbs of Sydney, studied at Fort Street High School, and visual communications design at Sydney College of the Arts and export marketing at Monash University. Her mother, Vivian Chan Shaw, designed and produced knitwear, and Claudia used her training to establish an export market for her mother's eponymous clothing label. They currently work as design and retail partners operating a knitwear boutique in Sydney's Queen Victoria Building.

Chan Shaw had appeared on the Australian Broadcasting Corporation's (ABC) series Collectors as a guest in 2008, showcasing her collection of tin space toys and toy robots. When panellist Nicolle Warren left the show, Chan Shaw was asked to replace her and appeared in her first episode as a panellist on 14 February 2010.

References

Year of birth missing (living people)
Living people
Australian fashion designers
Australian women fashion designers
Australian television presenters
Australian women television presenters
Australian people of Chinese descent
People from the Inner West (Sydney)
Australian collectors
Toy collectors